Absil is a surname. Notable people with the surname include:

 Hugues Absil (born 1961), French painter
 Jean Absil (1893–1974), Belgian composer

See also

References 

French-language surnames